Sargachi Ramakrishna Mission High School is a boys-only day and boarding school in West Bengal, India, and it is located in Sargachi, of the  Murshidabad district. The school was founded in 1897 by Swami Akhndananda ji Maharaj. It is affiliated to the West Bengal Council of Higher Secondary Education and West Bengal Board of Secondary Education.

History 

Swami Akhandananda Maharaj, a direct disciple of Sri Ramakrishna, established this institution in 1897. He came to the nearby village Mahula for helping the famine affected poor villagers of Murshidabad on 15 May 1897. The present site of Sargachi ashrama was taken over in 1913. Akhandananda started an orphanage and primary school initially to provide quality education to the local students.

At present, this is a higher secondary school now. There is a hostel for about 65 boys besides the school, where about 12 students from each class between V to X reside. This institution has been governed by many respected missionaries of the  ramakrishna mission. Most respected among them include Swami Devarajananda maharaj, Swami Jnanolokananda maharaj & now Swami Tapanisthananda maharaj. Respected vice president Swami Suhitananda maharaj has served the post of secretary of ashrama which is now being maintained by Swami Biswamayananda.

References

High schools and secondary schools in West Bengal
Schools in Murshidabad district
Educational institutions established in 1897
Schools affiliated with the Ramakrishna Mission
Boarding schools in West Bengal
1897 establishments in British India